Ray Thomas (1941–2018) was an English musician and a former member of The Moody Blues.

Ray Thomas may also refer to:

 Ray Thomas (politician) (1917–1985), Canadian judge and politician
 Ray Thomas (rugby league), Australian rugby league footballer
 Ray Thomas (baseball) (1910–1993), American baseball player
 Ray Thomas (footballer, born 1926) (1926–1989), Australian footballer for Essendon and South Melbourne
 Ray Thomas (footballer, born 1940) (1940–2021), Australian footballer for Collingwood
 Ray B. Thomas (1884–1931), American college football coach for New Hampshire and Vermont

See also
 Rae Thomas, fictional character in American soap opera Passions
 Raymond Thomas (disambiguation)